Joli is a surname. Notable people with the surname include:

 Antonio Joli (1700–1777), Italian painter
 France Joli (born 1963), Canadian singer
 Guillaume Joli (born 1985), French handball player

See also
 Joli OS, an operating system developed by the company Jolicloud
 Jolie (disambiguation)